Theoretical Economics is a peer-reviewed open access academic journal that publishes theoretical papers in all areas of economics. The journal was established in 2006. From then until 2009, it was published by the Society for Economic Theory. On July 1, 2009 the Econometric Society took over the journal. The current editor is Ran Spiegler. The journal is abstracted and indexed in Current Contents/Social and Behavioral Sciences and the Social Sciences Citation Index.

References

External links 
 

Economics journals
Open access journals
Triannual journals
English-language journals
Publications established in 2006
Academic journals published by learned and professional societies
Econometric Society